Aliaksandr Viktaravich Bahdanovich (born 29 April 1982) is a Belarusian sprint canoeist. Competing in three Summer Olympics, he won a gold medal in the C-2 1000 m event at Beijing in 2008 together with Andrei Bahdanovich.  They won silver in the same event in London. At the 2004 Games, he finished sixth in the C-2 500 m event rowing with Aleksandr Kurlyandchik.

Bahdanovich also won six medals at the ICF Canoe Sprint World Championships with a gold (C-4 200 m: 2009), two silvers (C-2 1000 m: 2010, C-4 1000 m: 2001) and three bronzes (C-4 200 m: 2005, C-4 1000 m: 2002, 2006).

References

External links
Canoe09.ca profile

1982 births
Living people
Belarusian male canoeists
Canoeists at the 2004 Summer Olympics
Canoeists at the 2008 Summer Olympics
Canoeists at the 2012 Summer Olympics
Olympic canoeists of Belarus
Olympic gold medalists for Belarus
Olympic medalists in canoeing
Olympic silver medalists for Belarus
ICF Canoe Sprint World Championships medalists in Canadian
Medalists at the 2012 Summer Olympics
Medalists at the 2008 Summer Olympics
European Games medalists in canoeing
European Games gold medalists for Belarus
Canoeists at the 2015 European Games
People from Mogilev
Sportspeople from Mogilev Region